Carole Anne-Marie Gist (born May 8, 1969) is an American TV host, model and first African American woman to win the Miss USA title.

Gist first won the title of Miss Michigan USA and went on to win the Miss USA crown on March 2, 1990, in Wichita, Kansas. The 1990 pageant had representatives from Georgia (Brenda Leithleiter), Alaska (Karin Elizabeth Meyer), Kentucky (Tiffany Tenfelde), South Carolina (Gina Tolleson, who as first runner-up then went on to represent the country at the Miss World pageant, winning the title) and Karin Hartz of New Jersey making up with Gist the Top 6 finalists. Gist, a  Detroit native, 20 years old at the time, eventually became first runner-up to Mona Grudt of Norway in the Miss Universe pageant of that same year. She was also the first contestant from Michigan to win Miss USA, and broke the five-year streak of winners from Texas.

Personal life
Gist is a graduate of Cass Technical High School in Detroit. At the time of her coronation, she was a junior marketing and management major at Northwood University at Midland, Michigan.

References

1969 births
Cass Technical High School alumni
Living people
Miss Universe 1990 contestants
Miss USA 1990 delegates
Miss USA winners
People from Midland, Michigan
Television personalities from Detroit
Northwood University alumni
African-American beauty pageant winners
20th-century American people
20th-century African-American women
20th-century African-American people